Tamitsa is a rural locality (a selo) in Pokrovskoye Rural Settlement of Onezhsky District, Arkhangelsk Oblast, Russia. The population was 245 as of 2010. There are 2 streets.

Geography 
Tamitsa is located on the Tamitsa River, 36 km north of Onega (the district's administrative centre) by road. Kyanda is the nearest rural locality.

References 

Rural localities in Onezhsky District
Onezhsky Uyezd